The 2008 Rally Japan was the fourteenth and penultimate round of the 2008 World Rally Championship season. The event saw Sébastien Loeb clinch his fifth consecutive world drivers title with his drive to a third-place finish. The event was won by Mikko Hirvonen in a Ford Focus, who led the event from start to finish to claim his third win of the season. Second place went to Hirvonen's teammate Jari-Matti Latvala, his fifth podium of the year and his first since the Rally of Turkey back in June.

Stobart M-Sport Ford's François Duval crashed out from second place during the sixth stage. Duval was not injured in the crash, but his co-driver Patrick Pivato sustained a fractured pelvis and tibia. He was rushed to the hospital, and internal bleeding was discovered during surgery. On day two of the rally, after a second operation, his condition was described as critical but stable.

On the 19th stage, Toni Gardemeister took the Suzuki World Rally Team's first-ever stage win. Suzuki also had their most successful rally to date with Gardemeister finishing sixth and teammate Per-Gunnar Andersson recording his best ever finish of fifth position.

The event was originally planned to run on October 24−26, but as to make full use of venues, including the Sapporo Dome, with its tenant the Hokkaido Nippon Ham Fighters possibly needing it for the Japan Series, the event was approved by FIA to be delayed for a week.  The dome was not needed for baseball, as the Ham Fighters didn't make it to the Japan Series.

The Sapporo Dome Super Special Stage was the second to be held in indoor venues in WRC history.

Results

Special stages 
All dates and times are JST (UTC+9).

Championship standings after the event

Drivers' championship

Manufacturers' championship

References

External links

 Results from the official site wrc.com
 Results at eWRC.com
 Results from Jonkka's World Rally Archive

Japan
2008
Rally